Paul Kuniholm is a heritage-connected public artist who creates art  embodying sculptural objects, sculpture both fugitive and durable, art using digital material, wearable art intervention, video, mural art, and various time-based artwork that is exhibited in the public right-of-way,  museums and other cultural venues internationally.

References

External links

 https://www.facebook.com/belltownartwalk/videos/10156137796766328/

American people of Swedish descent
Living people
1970 births